Urdiales is a surname. Notable people with the surname include:

Alberto Urdiales (born 1968), Spanish handball player
Andrew Urdiales (1964–2018), American serial killer
José Raúl Baena Urdiales (born 1989), Spanish footballer

See also 
Castro Urdiales, is a seaport of northern Spain
Urdiales del Páramo, is a municipality located in the province of León, Spain